Carl Johan Church is a Church of Sweden parish church on Sagberget, in Gothenburg. The church, designed by Fredrik Blom, is named after King Charles XIV John (Karl XIV Johan), who a year before the opening ceremony  in 1826 was on a visit to the nearby porter brewery at Klippan.

The parish serves Kungsladugård, Nya Varvet, Sandarna and large parts of Majorna.

References

19th-century Church of Sweden church buildings
Churches in Gothenburg
Churches in the Diocese of Gothenburg